Zahedan County is in Sistan and Baluchestan province, Iran. The capital of the county is the city of Zahedan. At the 2006 census, the county's population was 663,822 in 130,763 households. The following census in 2011 counted 660,575 people in 157,139 households. At the 2016 census, the county's population was 672,589 in 168,480 households, by which time Mirjaveh District had been separated from the county to form Mirjaveh County.

Administrative divisions

The population history and structural changes of Zahedan County's administrative divisions over three consecutive censuses are shown in the following table. The latest census shows three districts, six rural districts, and two cities.

References

 

Counties of Sistan and Baluchestan Province